Nichole Marie Hiltz is an American actress. She has appeared in several films, made-for-TV movies, and television series. Her most recent long-running television credit is for USA Network's In Plain Sight from 2008 to 2012 in which she portrayed Brandi Shannon, younger sister of the main character.

Hiltz has made guest appearances on several television shows, including NYPD Blue, The O.C., Strong Medicine, Cold Case, The Shield, Buffy the Vampire Slayer, V.I.P., CSI: Crime Scene Investigation, Bones,  and Smallville.  She also appeared in three episodes of Desperate Housewives. She played the semiregular character Ginny Dannegan in The Riches.

Early life
Hiltz got into acting via performers such as Michelle Pfeiffer, and the show Punky Brewster. This would lead her to take acting classes in Boston after high school.

Personal life
For a short time in 2006, Hiltz was engaged to Canadian actor Mike Smith (of Trailer Park Boys fame).  The two actors met during the filming of Trailer Park Boys: The Big Dirty.

Filmography

Film

Television

References

External links

American film actresses
American television actresses
Living people
Actresses from Boston
People from Hanover, Massachusetts
21st-century American women
Year of birth missing (living people)